Johan Idrele (born 29 January 1995) is a New Caledonian footballer who plays as a midfielder for New Caledonian club Lossi and the New Caledonian national team.

Club career
Poma started his career in the youth of AS Wetr. In 2014 he moved to the first team and made his debut. In January 2018 he moved to Lössi to play with them in the 2018 OFC Champions League.

National team
In 2017 Idrele was called up for the New Caledonia national football team. He made his debut on November 26, 2017, in a 1–1 draw against Estonia when he came in during the 68 minute of play replacing Mone Wamowe.

References

New Caledonian footballers
Association football midfielders
New Caledonia international footballers
Living people
1995 births
AS Lössi players